Daniel Gafford (born October 1, 1998) is an American professional basketball player for the Washington Wizards of the National Basketball Association (NBA). He played college basketball for the Arkansas Razorbacks and was drafted in the second round of the 2019 NBA draft by the Chicago Bulls. He plays both the power forward and center positions.

High school career
Gafford was a four star recruit in high school, and received offers in 2015 from multiple schools, including Kansas, Vanderbilt, and Florida. On August 1, 2015, Gafford went to Arkansas. Gafford also used to played football growing up and played at wide receiver until ninth grade at El Dorado High School. He was also in the marching band and credits that to the development of his skill set.

College career
In his first start for the Razorbacks, Gafford finished a perfect 8 for 8 shooting, along with 7 rebounds and 6 blocks against Minnesota. Gafford posted 21 points, 10 rebounds and seven blocks against No. 14 Auburn. After a freshman season where he averaged 11.8 points 6.2 rebounds per game, Gafford announced that he would return to Arkansas for his sophomore year rather than declare for the 2018 NBA Draft. After his freshman season, Gafford was named to the SEC All-Freshman team. On March 18, 2019, after Gafford's sophomore season, it was announced that Gafford would skip the 2019 National Invitation Tournament to prepare for the 2019 NBA draft. Gafford improved his statistics during his second year at Arkansas, averaging 16.9 points, 8.6 rebounds, and 1.9 blocks per game. He was named to the 2019 SEC All-Defensive Team, as well as a 1st Team All-SEC pick.

Professional career

Chicago Bulls (2019–2021)
Gafford was the 38th overall selection by the Chicago Bulls in the 2019 NBA Draft. On July 8, 2019, the Chicago Bulls declared that they had signed Gafford. On October 26, 2019, Gafford played his NBA debut, coming off the bench in an 84–108 loss to the Toronto Raptors with a rebound. He was assigned to the Windy City Bulls for opening night of the NBA G League season. On January 15, 2020, Gafford injured his thumb just 1 minute and 21 seconds into a match against the Washington Wizards. The next day, it was announced that he wouldn't play for around two to four weeks because he had a dislocated thumb.

Washington Wizards (2021–present)
On March 25, 2021, Gafford was traded to the Washington Wizards in a three-team trade involving the Boston Celtics. During the 2021 NBA playoffs, Daniel Gafford broke the all-time record for field goal percentage (minimum 15 shot attempts) with an astounding 84.6%.

On October 18, 2021, Gafford signed a three-year, $40.2 million contract extension with the Wizards.

On March 7, 2023, Gafford made a buzzer-beating, game-winning putback in a 119–117 win over the Detroit Pistons.

Career statistics

NBA

Regular season

|-
| style="text-align:left;"| 
| style="text-align:left;"| Chicago
| 43 || 7 || 14.2 || .701 || — || .533 || 2.5 || .5 || .3 || 1.3 || 5.1
|-
| style="text-align:left;"| 
| style="text-align:left;"| Chicago
| 31 || 11 || 12.4 || .690 || — || .659 || 3.3 || .5 || .4 || 1.1 || 4.7
|-
| style="text-align:left;"| 
| style="text-align:left;"| Washington
| 23 || 0 || 17.7 || .681 || — || .672 || 5.6 || .5 || .7 || 1.8 || 10.1
|-
| style="text-align:left;"| 
| style="text-align:left;"| Washington
| 72 || 53 || 20.1 || .693 || .000 || .699 || 5.7 || .9 || .4 || 1.4 || 9.4
|- class="sortbottom"
| style="text-align:center;" colspan="2"| Career
| 169 || 71 || 16.8 || .692 || .000 || .657 || 4.4 || .7 || .4 || 1.4 || 7.6

Playoffs

|-
| style="text-align:left;"| 2021
| style="text-align:left;"| Washington
| 5 || 2 || 23.4 || .846 || — || .625 || 5.8 || .6 || 1.0 || 2.0 || 11.8
|- class="sortbottom"
| style="text-align:center;" colspan="2"| Career
| 5 || 2 || 23.4 || .846 || — || .625 || 5.8 || .6 || 1.0 || 2.0 || 11.8

College

|-
| style="text-align:left;"| 2017–18
| style="text-align:left;"| Arkansas
| 35 || 26 || 22.6 || .605 || – || .528 || 6.2 || .7 || .5 || 2.2 || 11.8
|-
| style="text-align:left;"| 2018–19
| style="text-align:left;"| Arkansas
| 32 || 32 || 28.7 || .660 || – || .591 || 8.6 || .7 || .9 || 1.9 || 16.9
|- class="sortbottom"
| style="text-align:center;" colspan="2"| Career
| 67 || 58 || 25.5 || .635 || – || .562 || 7.4 || .7 || .7 || 2.1 || 14.5

References

External links
NBA.com profile
Arkansas Razorbacks bio

1998 births
Living people
African-American basketball players
American men's basketball players
Arkansas Razorbacks men's basketball players
Basketball players from Arkansas
Centers (basketball)
Chicago Bulls draft picks
Chicago Bulls players
People from El Dorado, Arkansas
Power forwards (basketball)
Washington Wizards players
Windy City Bulls players
21st-century African-American sportspeople